Mahlon ( Maḥlōn) and Chilion (כִּלְיוֹן Ḵilyōn) were two brothers mentioned in the Book of Ruth. They were the sons of Elimelech of the tribe of Judah and his wife Naomi. Together with their parents, they settled in the land of Moab during the period of the Israelite Judges. On foreign soil, Mahlon married the Moabite convert Ruth (Ruth 4:10) while Chilion married the Moabite convert Orpah.

Biography

The test of childless Ruth and Orpah
Elimelech and his sons all died in Moab, leaving Naomi, Ruth, and Orpah widowed. Ruth and Orpah did not bear Jewish children, too. The story in the book tells that Naomi plans to return to Israel, and that she tests her daughters-in-law. She gives them the advice to return to their mother's home: which would mean drastically violating Jewish Law and reverting to Moabite culture and idol worship.

Ruth in Israel
While Orpah returns and leaves Judaism, Ruth chooses to stay with Naomi, thus proving her former conversion to be a real one.  In Israel, Ruth then takes part in a levirate marriage, according to Jewish law. By marrying a relative of Mahlon's, she is doing an act which will ensure that Mahlon's paternal lineage is not forgotten. Any child she bears in the levirate marriage will be considered as if it were Mahlon's child. Actually, she marries a relative of Elimelech, Boaz. Her child, Obed (biologically Boaz's but counted as if Mahlon's), becomes the paternal grandfather of David ha-Melech (King David).

Meaning of the names
Mahlon literally means "sickness" and Chilion "wasting", so the names align closely with the characters' role in the story (as do the other characters' names). This stylisation helps give a consciously fairytale-like quality to the story. It also reflects a culture of naming children based on external events, such as Naomi, changing her name to Mara. “Call me Mara, because the Almighty has dealt quite bitterly with me." Abram changing his name to Abraham, Peleg being named after the division of nations (the name means division). "Sickness" and "Chilion" being born in a time of famine follows this trend.

References

Moab
Hebrew Bible people
Brother duos
People from Bethlehem
Book of Ruth
Tribe of Judah